Kowal  is a town in Włocławek County, Kuyavian-Pomeranian Voivodeship, Poland, with 3,478 inhabitants (2004).

The town is located on Poland's most important north-south highway, National Road 1 (DK1). The town bypass for this road was opened in December, 2007, allowing heavy traffic to avoid the town center. The A1 motorway passes just to the northeast of the town.

Its local association football team is Kujawiak Kowal.

Notable people
The town is the birthplace of 
 Casimir III, (1310–1370), King of Poland, 1333 to 1370.
 Max Kowalski (1882—1956) a German composer, singer and singing teacher.
 Dominik Jędrzejewski (1886–1942) martyred Roman Catholic priest

References

Cities and towns in Kuyavian-Pomeranian Voivodeship
Włocławek County
Brześć Kujawski Voivodeship
Warsaw Governorate
Warsaw Voivodeship (1919–1939)
Pomeranian Voivodeship (1919–1939)